Jonathan A. Kraft (born March 4, 1964) is an American businessman. He is president of The Kraft Group, the holding company of the Kraft family's business interests. He is also the president of the New England Patriots and investor-operator of the New England Revolution.

Early life and education
Kraft was born in Brookline, Massachusetts, to a Jewish family, one of four children of New England Patriots owner Robert Kraft and his late wife Myra Kraft. Robert Kraft is worth an estimated $4.8 billion, according to Forbes and ranks as 108th richest person in 2015. Kraft attended the Belmont Hill School for high school. In 1986, Kraft graduated from Williams College with a bachelor's degree in history. He served on Williams' board of trustees from 2003 until 2015. After working as a consultant at Bain & Company for two years, Kraft earned his MBA from Harvard Business School in 1990.

Professional career

New England Patriots
In 1994, Kraft helped his family create a plan to purchase the New England Patriots. Since his family's purchase of the team, Kraft has held the titles of Vice President, Vice chairman and President.

Role with the NFL
Within the National Football League, Kraft has served on multiple committees, including the Digital Media and Business Ventures committees. In March 2006, when the National Football League Players Association and the NFL were deadlocked in contract negotiations, Kraft helped design a revenue sharing plan that was used for that version of the collective bargaining agreement.

New England Revolution
In 1995, Major League Soccer was started. One of the inaugural teams in the league was the Revolution. Kraft has been the co-owner/investor of the Revolution, along with his father, since its inception. In 2002, the Revolution played in their first final against the Galaxy in the MLS Cup. The final was held at Gillette Stadium, previously named CMGI Field, in Foxborough, Massachusetts. The match had a record crowd and the Revolution lost. They made four more MLS Cup appearances in 2005, 2006, 2007, and 2014.

Other soccer involvements
Kraft was also an owner/investor of the San Jose Earthquakes from 1999 to 2000 when the Kraft Group owned the team.

Massachusetts General Hospital
Kraft has served on the Board of Trustees of Massachusetts General Hospital since 2010 and was named chair in 2019 after the departure of Cathy Minehan.

COVID-19 pandemic
In March 2020, Kraft and his father offered the use of the Patriots team airplane to Massachusetts to deliver more than a million N95 masks from Shenzhen, China for use by medical professionals to help mitigate the COVID-19 pandemic in the United States. Some of the supplies landed in Boston on April 2, 2020 after several weeks of preparation.

Personal life
In 1995, Kraft married Patricia Lipoma in a Jewish ceremony at the Chestnut Hill home of his parents. She is a convert to Judaism. He has 3 children, two sons and a daughter.

Awards and honors
Six-time Super Bowl champion – as an executive with the New England Patriots

References

External links
 New England Patriots profile
 The Kraft Group

1964 births
Living people
American chief executives
American corporate directors
American financiers
American manufacturing businesspeople
American media executives
American people of Lithuanian-Jewish descent
American real estate businesspeople
American soccer chairmen and investors
Bain & Company employees
Businesspeople from Massachusetts
Harvard Business School alumni
Jewish American sportspeople
Kraft family
Major League Soccer executives
National Football League team presidents
New England Patriots executives
New England Revolution
People from Brookline, Massachusetts
Williams College alumni
Belmont Hill School alumni